Queen Bees and Wannabes is a 2002 book for parents by Rosalind Wiseman.  It focuses on the ways in which girls in high schools form cliques, and on patterns of aggressive teenage girl behavior and how to deal with them. The book was, in large part, the basis for the film Mean Girls (2004) starring Lindsay Lohan. The book's third edition was published in 2016.

See also
 Female intrasexual competition
 Queen bee (sociology)

References

Further reading
 

2002 non-fiction books
American non-fiction books
Mean Girls (franchise)
Non-fiction books adapted into films
Self-help books
Social groups
Works about adolescence
Works about parenting
Three Rivers Press books